Daína Chaviano (born 19 February 1957, Havana) is a Cuban-American writer of French and Asturian descent. She has lived in the United States since 1991.

She is considered one of the three most important female fantasy and science fiction writers in the Spanish language, along with Angélica Gorodischer (Argentina) and Elia Barceló (Spain), forming the so-called “feminine trinity of science fiction in Ibero-America.”

In Cuba, she published several science fiction and fantasy books, becoming the most renowned and best-selling author in those genres in Cuban literature.

Biography
She was born in Havana, the eldest of four children of an economist father, and a mother with two Ph.D.: one in Philosophy and Letters, and the other in Psychology.

When she had barely begun her university studies, she won the first science fiction competition ever organized in Cuba with her short story collection Los mundos que amo (The Worlds I Love), in 1979. After the book was published (1980), the main story was adapted and published as a photonovel in 1982, selling 200,000 copies in 3 months, an unprecedented fact that started her popularity as an author. The plot – almost the same in the short story and in its photonovel version – has been considered "an editorial phenomenon" that "questioned the hierarchical structures that the governing institutions of the revolutionary culture imposed in the literary field as early as 1960". This sales record "broke with an editorial logic that considered science fiction as a minor genre." 

After earning a bachelor's degree in English Language and Literature at the University of Havana, she established the first science fiction literary workshop in her country, which she named “Oscar Hurtado” in honor of the father of that genre on the Caribbean island.

In 1991, she left Cuba, establishing residency in the United States, where she worked as a translator, columnist, and editor. In 1998, she achieved international recognition when she was awarded the Azorín Prize for Best Novel in Spain for El hombre, la hembra y el hambre. This work forms part of her series «The Occult Side of Havana», together with Casa de juegos, Gata encerrada, and La isla de los amores infinitos (The Island of Eternal Love, Riverhead Books, 2008). The series has been described as “the most coherent novelistic project of its generation, indispensable for understanding the social psychology and spiritual vicissitudes of the Cuban people.” The Island of Eternal Love has been published in 26 languages, making it the most widely translated Cuban novel of all time. In 2007, the novel was awarded the gold medal at the Florida Book Awards, in the category Best Book in Spanish Language.

In 2004, she was the guest of honor at the 25th International Conference for the Fantastic in the Arts (ICFA) in the United States. It was the first time that honor had ever been conferred on a Spanish-language writer. In November 2014, she was the guest of honor during the University Book Fair in Tabasco (Mexico), where she received the Malinalli National Award for the Promotion of Arts, Human Rights and Cultural Diversity, which until then had only received figures of Mexican culture and society. It was the first time this award was given to an international figure.

Her short story collection, Extraños testimonios, was published in 2017. In an interview, Chaviano classified the genre of this work as "Caribbean Gothic", as it brings together "elements of horror, absurdity, eroticism, and a certain dose of humor à la Cortázar, amidst tropical and sunny environments, specifically in the Caribbean."

In 2019, her historical thriller Los hijos de la Diosa Huracán was published by Grijalbo, the Spanish imprint of Penguin Random House. The novel, which required more than a decade of research work, recreates and rescues the Taínos'  world, following the trail and paying homage to the legacy of the main Caribbean indigenous culture. Hence the importance of Taino mythology in the novel, especially the symbolism of their three main goddesses: Atabey, Guabancex, and Iguanaboína. 

In 2020, the novel was awarded the gold medal at the Florida Book Awards 2019 contest, in the category Best Book in Spanish Language, making Chaviano the only writer to twice receive the award in that category.

Her País de dragones, which was published in Colombia in 2021, won the Los Mejores de Banco del Libro, an award given to the best books for children and young people published in Spanish anywhere in the world.

Chaviano has been a guest lecturer and visiting author at several universities and colleges, like Denison University (2007), Florida International University (2014), Miami Dade College (2016), and University of North Georgia (2017). 

She is a cousin of Cuban actor César Évora.

Literary influences
Her literary influences derive fundamentally from the Celtic world, from diverse mythologies, and from the principal epics of ancient peoples. Among these sources one can find the Arthurian cycle; Greek, Roman, Egyptian, pre-Columbian and Afro-Cuban myths; and humankind's first epics, dating back to prehistory, such as the Epic of Gilgamesh, the Mahabharata, the Popol Vuh, the Odyssey, and other similar works.

The author has said she has no affinity with Cuban literature. She has stated that, with the exception of authors such as Manuel Mujica Laínez and Mario Vargas Llosa, her only point of contact with Latin America is pre-Columbian mythology. Her passion for Anglo-Saxon literature was so strong that, when she entered the university, she decided to major in English literature so that she could read many of these authors in their original language.

Daína Chaviano's works have been described as “bold experiments that break down the boundaries between genres.”

Works in English
 2019: "Dolores" (short story, trans. by Marilyn G. Miller), in Island in the Light / Isla en la luz (bilingüal anthology of literary works inspired by contemporary Cuban art), ed. by L. Padura, W. Guerra & C. Garaicoa, Miami: tra.Publishing.    
 2017: "Accursed Lineage" (short story, trans. by Matthew David Goodwin), in Latin@ Rising: An Anthology of Latin@ Science Fiction and Fantasy, ed. by Matthew David Goodwin, Texas: Wings Press. 
 2008: The Island of Eternal Love (trans. Andrea Labinger). New York: Riverhead Books-Penguin Group.
 2003: "The Annunciation" (short story, trans. by Juan Carlos Toledano), in Andrea L. Bell & Yolanda Molina-Gavilán (eds), Cosmos Latinos: An Anthology of Science Fiction from Latin America and Spain, Connecticut: Wesleyan University Press.

Works in Spanish
Outside Cuba:
 2019: Los hijos de la Diosa Huracán (novel). Grijalbo, Spain.
 2018: Fábulas de una abuela extraterrestre (novel). Huso, Spain.
 2017: El abrevadero de los dinosaurios (short stories). Huso, Spain.
 2017: Extraños testimonios (short stories). Huso, Spain.
 2007: Historias de hadas para adultos (novellas). Minotauro, Spain.
 2006:  La isla de los amores infinitos (novel). Grijalbo, Spain.
 2005: El abrevadero de los dinosaurios (short stories). Nueva Imagen, Mexico.
 2004: Los mundos que amo (short novel). Alfaguara, Colombia.
 2003: Fábulas de una abuela extraterrestre (novel). Oceano, Mexico.
 2001: País de dragones (short stories). Espasa Juvenil, Spain.
 2001: Gata encerrada (novel). Planeta, Spain.
 1999: Casa de juegos (novel). Planeta, Spain.
 1998: El hombre, la hembra y el hambre (novel). Planeta, Spain.
 1994: Confesiones eróticas y otros hechizos (poetry). Betania, Spain.

In Cuba:
 1990: El abrevadero de los dinosaurios (short stories).
 1989: La anunciación (film script).
 1988: Fábulas de una abuela extraterrestre (novel).
 1986: Historias de hadas para adultos (novellas).
 1983: Amoroso planeta (short stories).
 1980: Los mundos que amo (short stories).

Awards and Recognitions
 2022: Winner at Los Mejores de Banco del Libro (Venezuela), for País de dragones. 
 2020: First Place in two categories (Best Popular Fiction and Best Novel Adventure or Drama in Spanish) in the International Latino Book Awards, for Los hijos de la Diosa Huracán.
 2020: Gold Medal Winner in the Florida Book Awards 2019, for Best Spanish Language Book (USA), for Los hijos de la Diosa Huracán.
 2017: Guest of Honor at the 12th North American Science Fiction Convention (San Juan, Puerto Rico).
 2014: Malinalli National Award 2014 for the Promotion of Arts, Human Rights and Cultural Diversity (Mexico).
 2014: Guest of Honor at the Tabasco University Book Fair (Mexico).
 2010: International Dublin Literary Award IMPAC Longlist for The Island of Eternal Love.
 2008: Finalist of the Prix Relay du Roman d'Évasion (France), for L'île des amours éternelles (The Island of Eternal Love).
 2007: Gold Medal Winner in the Florida Book Awards 2006, for Best Spanish Language Book (USA), for La isla de los amores infinitos (The Island of Eternal Love).
 2004: Guest of Honor at the 25th Conference held by the International Association for the Fantastic in the Arts, Fort Lauderdale (USA).
 2003: Goliardos Fantasy International Award (Mexico), for Fábulas de una abuela extraterrestre.
 1998: Azorín Prize for Best Novel (Spain), for El hombre, la hembra y el hambre.
 1990: Anna Seghers Award, Academy of Arts in Berlin (Germany), for Fábulas de una abuela extraterrestre.
 1989: "La Edad de Oro" (The Golden Age) National Prize for Children's and Young People's Literature (Cuba), for País de dragones.
 1988: "13 de marzo", Best Literary Film Script (Cuba), for La anunciación.
 1979: David National Prize for Best SF Book (Cuba), for Los mundos que amo.

See also
 Cuban American literature
 List of Cuban-American writers

Notes

External links
Author's entry in Encyclopaedia Britannica
Daína Chaviano Official Website (Bilingual in English & Spanish)
Amazon.com Official Author's Page

Daína Chaviano's Page at Penguin
GoodRead Author's Page
The Encyclopedia of Science Fiction, John Clute & Peter Nichols
Book Trailer of the novel The Island of Eternal Love.
Science Fiction Trading Card Spotlight - Daína Chaviano

20th-century Cuban novelists
20th-century Cuban poets
20th-century Cuban women writers
21st-century Cuban novelists
21st-century Cuban poets
21st-century Cuban women writers
21st-century short story writers
1957 births
American people of Asturian descent
American Spanish-language poets
American Spanish-language writers
American writers of Cuban descent
Cuban emigrants to the United States
Cuban expatriates in the United States
Cuban fantasy writers
Cuban people of Asturian descent
Cuban people of Spanish descent
Cuban science fiction writers
Cuban short story writers
Cuban women novelists
Cuban women poets
Cuban women short story writers
Exiles of the Cuban Revolution in the United States
Hispanic and Latino American novelists
Living people
People from Havana
Women science fiction and fantasy writers
Writers from Havana